In Harihar Nagar is a 1990 Indian Malayalam-language comedy thriller film written and directed by Siddique-Lal. The film, set in the fictional locality of Harihar Nagar follows four unemployed bachelors: Mahadevan (Mukesh), Govindan Kutty (Siddique), Appukuttan (Jagadeesh) and Thomas Kutty (Ashokan) and their attempts to woo their new neighbour Maya (Geetha Vijayan) However, she is in town to investigate the mysterious circumstances surrounding the death of her brother. It also stars Rizabawa, Kaviyoor Ponnamma and Rekha, with Suresh Gopi and Sai Kumar making cameo appearances. The music was composed by S. Balakrishnan.

In Harihar Nagar was released on 20 June 1990. The film was the fourth highest grossing Malayalam film of the year and ran for more than 100 days in theatres. The film is widely celebrated as one of the most popular Malayalam comedy films ever and has over the years gained a cult following, spawning two sequels — 2009's 2 Harihar Nagar, and 2010's In Ghost House Inn — and remakes in Hindi (Parda Hai Parda and Dhol), Kannada (Nagaradalli Nayakaru), Tamil (MGR Nagaril), and Telugu (Madhura Nagarilo). Its success also spawned a series of unrelated low budget comedy films featuring the principal cast, in the years that followed.

Plot
Mahadevan, Govindan Kutty, Appukuttan, and Thomas Kutty are four young men who live in a housing colony in Kochi named "Harihar Nagar". The movie starts with an incident that takes place in Bombay, where burglar John Honai breaks into a house to look for a briefcase. In the next scene, the four young men appear and use their wits to impress young neighbourhood girls. Maya, a girl from Kannur, and her grandparents relocate to Harihar Nagar, and happen to be Mahadevan's new neighbours. The four men try to win Maya over on many occasions. Mahadevan and Appukuttan fail to watch her bathing when her grandmother screams on suspicion of theft. She attempts to murder Govindan Kutty the next day, and Appukuttan's plan fails when Maya's grandfather is injured. They assault a bike owner and force him to blow air into it to get Maya's attention, but fail. One day, they bribe the postman to get hold of the letter she sent. They learn that Maya has come to Harihar Nagar to learn about the death of her brother, a boxer named Sethu Madhavan, which she thinks was a suicide.

Maya visits the mother a friend of her brother's whose name is Andrew at his home. She asks Ammachi, Andrew's mother, to contact her if she gets any information about her brother. The four men approach Andrew's mother and pretend to be Sethu's friends. They manage to get Sethu's photograph by telling him they wanted it for the colony's sports club. Maya gets this information from Ammachi and meets the four young men. She believes them to be Sethu's friends after seeing his photo at their house. Thomas Kutty meets her at the boxing club, faking that he is a boxer after knocking down the other three men who now fear Maya's grandparents because they suspect them. Thomas Kutty almost tells her the truth about Mahadevan, Appukuttan and Govindan Kutty, and only did not name them (calling them pickpockets and snatchers). They get angry. The four fabricate a story about how Sethu had an affair with a girl, and make her believe it by saying that the bike owner's henchmen who assault them are those of the parents of the girl, who opposed to the affair. They fight back the henchmen after letting Thomas Kutty get beaten up for a while because of his betrayal of them, and Maya believes them because they fake tears and sadness.

Hearing that the four men are friends of Sethu, John Honai kidnaps them to retrieve the briefcase on the pretext that he would let them leave in ten minutes. Maya, in search of her brother's former lover, learns of Annie Philip, a friend of her brother's whom he knew from the library. Annie is now a nun in a convent, and has adopted the name Sister Josephine. Annie reveals her history with Sethu. She tells her that Andrew's father was a businessman who was murdered by John Honai's father, and had built a business empire with the money stolen from Andrew's father. Andrew sought to cause trouble in the business to take revenge. Honai's father sold all of his assets and tried to run away with the money in the briefcase, but was murdered by Andrew on the way. Later, Andrew is seen dead on a beach, and Sethu leaves to Andrew's house, keeping Ammachi ignorant of his death. He gives Annie the briefcase. After returning to Bombay, Sethu gives Honai a briefcase similar to the one given to Annie; when Honai opens it, he finds it is full of bricks. Furious, he murdered Sethu. However, Annie is ignorant of the innocence of the four men, and tells Maya that they are Honai's gangsters.

The four young men who were kidnapped by Honai manage to escape, but are chased by him and his associates. Maya and her grandparents call the police because of the false information given by Annie about them. Maya and her grandparents are also kidnapped by Honai but the four young men rescue them. Ammachi finds out about Andrew's death from Annie, who gives her the briefcase. While Ammachi is cooking dinner, Honai comes to her house to get the briefcase. Ammachi removes a fuse and the lights go out. After trying to find Ammachi, Honai unknowingly lights a lighter near the lit gas stove and he quickly burns to death.

In the end, Maya and her grandparents are returning to Kannur. Maya gives the four young men the briefcase, which they open, finding it full of riches.

Cast 
 Mukesh as Mahadevan
 Siddique as Govindan Kutty
 Jagadish as Appukuttan
 Ashokan as Thomas Kutty
 Suresh Gopi as Sethumadhavan
 Sai Kumar as Andrews
 Rizabawa as John Honai
 Geetha Vijayan as Maya
 Kaviyoor Ponnamma as Andrew's mother
 Rekha as Sister Josephine / Annie Phillip
 Philomina as Sethumadhava and Maya's grandmother
 Paravoor Bharathan as Sethumadhavan and Maya's grandfather
 Appa Haja as Cherian
 Thrissur Elsy as Mahadevan's mother

Production

Development 
After directing the blockbuster Ramji Rao Speaking – which dealt with issues like unemployment and poverty, relevant social factors affecting Kerala of the 1980s, Siddique-Lal chose to set their second film, in a more laid back and fun environment. They decided to make a film that diverted from the usual commercial film that revolved around a hero and a heroine. The story was developed by Siddique and Lal from a thought which came to their minds, about a group of friends who gets mixed up in an issue due to the lies they make up, to woo a girl. Siddique and Lal had developed a story called Kallila Kolangal during their days in Mimics Parade. In the story, there was a character of a professional killer named Honai. The story was eventually developed by Sreenivasan into Nadodikkattu (1987). In the film, the name of the professional killer was changed to Pavanayi. Hence, the name of the antagonist in In Harihar Nagar was taken from the story they had developed. The film was jointly produced by Fazil's brother Khais and Ouseppachan's brother Kuriachan. The film also marked the debut of Swargachitra Appachan's Swargachitra Pictures, which distributed the film.

Casting 
Since Kuriachan and Khais were in Qatar, they put Fazil in charge of casting. Initially, Siddique and Lal had decided on Mukesh as Mahadevan, Jagadeesh as Appu, Appa Haja as Thomas and Ashokan as Govindan. Since the directors didn't have phones at the time, they sent the executive producer to talk to the actors and book their dates. The executive producer came back and told Siddique-Lal that everyone else except Jagadeesh was ready. The directors gave the role of Appu to Siddique, who was a mimicry artiste and had by then done minor roles in several films. A week before shooting began, Siddique-Lal went to Thiruvananthapuram for a discussion with Venu, who was the cinematographer. They chanced upon Jagadeesh at the railway station and asked him why he refused the role of Appukuttan. Jagadeesh however was surprised and told them that he wasn't even approached for the role. Jagadeesh told them that he and the executive producer weren't on good terms and used the opportunity to get back at him. The director duo then contacted Fazil and informed him of the situation. Fazil fired the executive producer on the spot. Then, Jagadeesh was given the role of Appukuttan and Siddique was given the role of Thomas. A new character, Cherian was developed for Appa Haji. 

The role of John Honai was originally planned for Raghuvaran, but since he had clashing dates it was eventually given to Kalabhavan's Rizabawa, who was a well-known theatre and mimicry artiste. He had earlier acted as the lead in Shaji Kailas' Dr. Pasupathy. Rizabawa was initially reluctant to do a negative role but was persuaded by his friends at Kalabhavan. They cast Geetha Vijayan, a debutant and Revathi's first cousin in the role of the heroine. Rekha had expressed her wish to act in a film directed by Fazil. She was called by Fazil to the sets of the film. However, on learning that the film was directed by Siddique-Lal she was disappointed. To satisfy Rekha's wish Fazil offered to shoot her scenes.

Soundtrack 
The soundtrack features two songs composed by S. Balakrishnan, with lyrics penned by Bichu Thirumala. The songs were remixed and used by Alex Paul for 2 Harihar Nagar, the first sequel of this film.

Track listing 
 "Ekantha Chandrike" - M. G. Sreekumar, Unni Menon
 "Unnam Marannu" - M. G. Sreekumar, Chorus

Reception
In Harihar Nagar was released on 20 June 1990, in 22 centers in Kerala. The film received critical acclaim. The film was a commercial success, running for 75-days in 7 centers, a 100-day theatrical run in 5 centers and completing a 150-day run in 2 theatres. In an episode in Charithram Enniloode, Siddique had told that the film was very popular with college students and were instrumental in making the film a success.

Critical response 
Upon release, the film received positive responses from critics. Rizabawa's charismatic portrayal of the antagonist, John Honai was praised. Alleppey Ashraf, in an interview with Safari TV in 2018 revealed that Rizabawa's performance in the film caught the attention of other filmmakers and he was offered to reprise his role as John Honai in all the remakes of the film, which he turned down. In 2019, Neelima Menon of The News Minute wrote: "It's how Siddique and Lal sneak in comedy at the most improbable scenes that makes In Harihar Nagar such a riot. Plus the goofy characters – each with their own brand of silliness, played with aplomb by Mukesh, Jagadeesh, Asokan and Siddique. With a lot of help from the queen mother of comedy, Philomena". In 2008, One India described the film as "among the most hilarious movies in Indian cinema".

Sequels

Nineteen years after the release of the original, In Harihar Nagar had a sequel 2 Harihar Nagar directed by Lal of the director-duo Siddique-Lal. It was released on 1 April 2009. After its success, its sequel, named In Ghost House Inn, was released on 25 March 2010.

Remakes
The world negative rights of the film belonged to Alleppey Ashraf. The Telugu remake rights of the film was acquired by Kodi Ramakrishna for a  hitherto record price of ₹ 5 lakhs, while the Tamil remake rights of the film were acquired by R. B. Choudary for a sum of ₹ 2 Lakhs. Another Tamil version of the film, titled Idhu MGR Illam, was under production, but it did not materialize and was cancelled.

Legacy 
The film was a breakthrough in the careers of Siddique, Jagadeesh and Rizabawa. Mukesh's dialogue, "Thomassukutty vittodaa" has become a catchphrase.

References

External links
 

1990 films
1990s Malayalam-language films
Indian comedy thriller films
1990s comedy thriller films
Films shot in Kochi
Malayalam films remade in other languages
In1
1990 comedy films
Films directed by Siddique–Lal